, also known as Unhappy Go Lucky! or Unhappy, is a Japanese comedy manga series written and illustrated by Cotoji. It focuses on a group of teenage girls with various misfortunes as they try to overcome them to find happiness. The series was serialized in Houbunsha's Manga Time Kirara Forward magazine from December 2012 to November 2018, and is published in English by Yen Press. An anime television series adaptation by Silver Link aired in Japan between April and June 2016.

Plot
 is an elite school where students train in various subjects. That is, except for the students of Class 1–7, a.k.a. the "Happiness Class", who have been deemed "unfortunate" and must try to overcome their own misfortune and achieve happiness. The series follows Anne "Hanako" Hanakoizumi, who has terrible luck, and her classmates Ruri, Botan, Hibiki, and Ren, who each have their own misfortunes, as they try to find their own happiness.

Characters

Main characters
 

A cheerful girl who has a constantly positive attitude despite having absolutely terrible luck, causing her to fall into manholes and the like. She loves animals but is constantly getting attacked by them.

 

A caring girl who seems perfectly normal albeit for a strange romantic obsession with a construction sign mascot.

 

A fragile girl who gets injured very easily (e.g. a handshake breaks her hand bones), though being the daughter of a doctor, she is efficient at treating her own injuries. She also has a negative aura and gets depressed over the smallest things.

 

A girl with a terrible sense of direction who gets lost easily. She is a tsundere with a crush on her childhood friend Ren and is hostile towards females who get close to her.

 

Hibiki's childhood friend, who has a strange condition in which females of any species are indiscriminately attracted to her. She is also rather dopey and enjoys sleeping.

Other characters

The homeroom teacher of Class 1-7.

A robotic rabbit butler who serves as a guide to the school.

A student with social anxiety, and the one who controls Timothy.

The homeroom teacher of Class 1-1, who does not agree with the methods of Class 1-7.

Anne's mother, who suffers a similar amount of misfortune as her daughter.

The principal (head teacher) of Tennomifune Academy.

Media

Manga
Cotoji began serializing the manga in the February 2013 issue of Houbunsha's Manga Time Kirara Forward magazine, sold in December 2012. The manga is licensed in North America by Yen Press. The manga ended serialization in the January 2019 issue of Manga Time Kirara Forward magazine, sold on November 24, 2018.

Volumes

Anime
An anime television series adaptation is animated by Silver Link, directed by Shin Oonuma and written by Hitoshi Tanaka, with character designs by Miwa Oshima. The series aired in Japan between April 7 and June 22, 2016, broadcasting on AT-X, Tokyo MX, Sun TV, KBS Kyoto, and BS Fuji, and was simulcast by Crunchyroll.

Video game
Characters from the series appear alongside other Manga Time Kirara characters in the mobile RPG, Kirara Fantasia in 2018.

Reception

Previews
Anime News Network had four editors review the first episode of the anime: Theron Martin gave praise to Silver Link and director Shin Oonuma for crafting a solid effort with sharp comedic direction, vibrant character artwork and movement, and an intriguing setting full of likable characters; Lynzee Loveridge commented on the show's debut being adequate with appropriate animation but middling humor, and added that the charm of the characters will determine the viewer's enjoyment; Rebecca Silverman was amused by the moe aesthetics and the characterization of both Hanako and Hibari but found the rest of the episode devoid of any substance and resembled more like every other gag manga adaptation. The fourth reviewer, Nick Creamer, commended the decent background art and light-hearted charm but said that the show doesn't do enough to distract viewers away from repetitious humor, generic characters and unearned moments of friendship and sincerity, concluding with: "Failing both in terms of humor and atmosphere, Anne-Happy counts as a pretty bottom-shelf genre entry."

Series reception
Allen Moody from THEM Anime Reviews found the series overall to be mediocre and boring, noting the main cast lacked intriguing personalities beyond their unlucky foibles, low comedic content and the absurd qualities of the Tennomifune Academy setting failing to grab viewers attention, concluding that both Non Non Biyori and Hidamari Sketch were better schoolgirl comedy recommendations.

References

External links
 

Japanese animated comedy television series
Anime series based on manga
Comedy anime and manga
Houbunsha manga
Manga adapted into television series
School life in anime and manga
Seinen manga
Silver Link
Tokyo MX original programming
Yen Press titles